Bartlet is a surname. Notable people with this surname include:

Elizabeth Bartlet (musicologist), Canadian musicologist
George Bartlet (1866–1951), Scottish clergyman, dean of Aberdeen and Orkney
John Bartlet (fl. 1606–1610), English composer
John Bartlet (divine) (fl. 1662), English Anglican nonconformist divine
Josiah Bartlet, fictional US president in the TV series West Wing
William Bartlet (died 1682), English minister

See also
Bartlett (surname)

English-language surnames